Saazish may refer to:

 Saazish (1975 film), a 1975 Bollywood action film 
 Saazish (1988 film), a 1988 Hindi-language Indian feature film
 Saazish (1998 film), a 1998 Hindi-language Indian feature film